The 2020–21 Vegas Golden Knights season was the fourth season for the National Hockey League franchise that started playing in the 2017–18 season. They played their home games at T-Mobile Arena on the Las Vegas Strip in Paradise, Nevada. They made the playoffs for the fourth straight season after losing in the Conference Final to the Dallas Stars in the 2020 Stanley Cup playoffs. On December 20, 2020, the league temporarily realigned into four divisions with no conferences due to the COVID-19 pandemic and the ongoing closure of the Canada–United States border. As a result of this realignment, the Golden Knights played this season in the West Division and only played games against the other teams in their new division during the regular season, and potentially the first two rounds of the playoffs.

On April 21, the Golden Knights clinched a playoff berth after a 5–2 win over the San Jose Sharks. They were tied with the Colorado Avalanche for first in the league, as well as first in the West Division, but lost the chance to claim their first ever Presidents' Trophy because of a tiebreaker, as they finished with fewer regulation wins than Colorado. The Golden Knights eliminated the Minnesota Wild in the First Round, with a 6–2 victory. In the Second Round, the Golden Knights defeated the Avalanche in six games. They faced the Montreal Canadiens in the Stanley Cup Semifinals, but were defeated in six games.

Standings

Divisional standings

Schedule and results

Regular season
The regular season schedule was published on December 23, 2020.

Playoffs

Player statistics

Skaters

Goaltenders

†Denotes player spent time with another team before joining the Golden Knights. Stats reflect time with the Golden Knights only.
‡Denotes player was traded mid-season. Stats reflect time with the Golden Knights only.
Bold/italics denotes franchise record.

Draft picks

Below are the Vegas Golden Knights' selections at the 2020 NHL Entry Draft, which was originally scheduled for June 26–27, 2020, at the Bell Center in Montreal, Quebec, but was postponed on March 25, 2020, due to the COVID-19 pandemic. The draft was held virtually via video conference call on October 6–7, 2020, from the NHL Network studio in Secaucus, New Jersey.

Notes

References

Vegas Golden Knights seasons
Vegas Golden Knights
Golden Knights
Golden Knights